The blesmols, also known as mole-rats, or African mole-rats, are burrowing rodents of the family Bathyergidae.  They represent a distinct evolution of a subterranean life among rodents much like the pocket gophers of North America, the tuco-tucos in South America, or the Spalacidae from Eurasia.

Distribution 
Modern blesmols are found strictly in sub-Saharan Africa.  Fossil forms are also restricted almost exclusively to Africa, although a few specimens of the Pleistocene species Cryptomys asiaticus have been found in Israel.  Nowak (1999) also reports that †Gypsorhychus has been found in fossil deposits of Mongolia.

Anatomy 
Blesmols are somewhat mole-like animals with cylindrical bodies and short limbs. Blesmols, like many other fossorial mammals, have greatly reduced eyes and ear pinnae, a relatively short tail, loose skin, and (aside from the hairless naked mole rat) velvety fur. Blesmols have very poor vision, although they may use the surfaces of their eyes for sensing air currents. Despite their small or absent pinnae, they have a good sense of hearing, although their most important sense appears to be that of touch. Like other rodents, they have an excellent sense of smell, and they are also able to close their nostrils during digging to prevent them from clogging with dirt.

The eyes of blesmols are structurally normal, despite their relatively small size, and include normal light-sensitive cells. However, the visual centres of their brains are reduced in certain respects, especially in those centres concerned with localising objects in the visual field. Research has shown that at least two species of blesmol (Fukomys mechowii and Heliophobius argenteocinereus) are not blind, as commonly believed, and will actively avoid blue or green-yellow light. They do not appear able to detect the presence of red light, and can probably not distinguish between different colours. The ability to sense the presence of light is probably useful in allowing them to detect breaches in their tunnel systems and repair them promptly.

Most blesmol species dig using their powerful incisors and, to a lesser extent, the foreclaws, although dune blesmols dig primarily with their feet, restricting them to soft, sandy soil. Dune blesmols aside, some species have been reported to be able to extend their burrows by an inch into the walls of concrete enclosures. Their unique skull shape is associated with delivering sheer power to the lateral masseter muscle which is responsible for  the powerful bite of the anterior portion of the mouth. The incisors of blesmols are projected forward and protrude from the mouth even when the mouth is closed. This condition allows the animals to burrow with their teeth without getting dirt in their mouths. The number of cheek teeth varies greatly between species, an unusual feature among rodents, so that the dental formula for the family is:

Technical characteristics 
The skull morphology of blesmols sets them apart from all other rodents.  As with all members of their suborder, their jaws are hystricognathous, but, unlike their relatives, they have a highly reduced infraorbital foramen.  The medial masseter muscle shows only minimal passage through the infraorbital foramen leading most authorities to consider them protrogomorphous.  They are therefore the only protrogomorphous hystricognaths.

Behavior 
Blesmols live in elaborate burrow systems and different species exhibit varying degrees of sociality.  Most species are solitary, but two species, the damaraland blesmol (Fukomys damarensis) and the naked mole-rat (Heterocephalus glaber) are considered to be the only two eusocial mammals.  These species are characterized by having a single reproductively active male and female in a colony where the remaining animals are sterile.

These animals prefer loose, sandy soils and are often associated with arid habitats. They rarely come to the surface, spending their entire life underground. Blesmols are herbivorous, and primarily eat roots, tubers, and bulbs. They are even able to pull smaller plants underground by their roots, without having to leave their burrows, enabling them to eat leaves, stems, and other parts of the plant that would otherwise be inaccessible. Blesmols burrow in search of food, and the great majority of their tunnel complex consists of these foraging burrows, surrounding a smaller number of storage areas, nests, and latrine chambers.

Most species breed only once or twice during the year, although some breed all year round. They generally have small litters of two to five young, perhaps because their environment is sufficiently safe that they do not need to rapidly replace their population as many other rodents do. However, some species have much larger litters, averaging twelve young in the naked mole rat, and sometimes much larger.

Classification 
The Bathyergidae are monophyletic, with all taxa tracing back to a single common ancestor. Although there is some controversy, the closest living relatives of the blesmols appear to be other African hystricognaths in the families Thryonomyidae (cane rats) and Petromuridae (dassie rats).  Together these three living families along with their fossil relatives represent the infraorder Phiomorpha.

At present 21 species of blesmols from 5 genera are accepted, but this number is likely to increase.  Like other fossorial rodents such as pocket gophers, tuco-tucos, and blind mole rats, blesmols appear to speciate rapidly.  They become geographically isolated easily, leading to various chromosomal forms and genetically distinct races.  Some studies have suggested that the genus Bathyergus represents the basal-most lineage; while many researchers had posited that the Naked mole-rat, Heterocephalus, held that position, more recent investigation has placed that genus in a separate family, Heterocephalidae.

Family Bathyergidae
Subfamily Bathyerginae
Georychus - cape blesmol
Georychus capensis - cape mole-rat
Cryptomys
Cryptomys holosericeus - greater grey mole-rat 
Cryptomys hottentotus - common mole-rat
Cryptomys mahali - Mahali mole-rat
Cryptomys natalensis - Natal mole-rat 
Cryptomys nimrodi - Matabeleland mole-rat
Fukomys
Fukomys amatus - Zambian mole-rat
Fukomys anselli - Ansell's mole-rat
Fukomys bocagei - Bocage's mole-rat
Fukomys damarensis - Damaraland mole-rat
Fukomys darlingi - Mashona mole-rat
Fukomys foxi - Nigerian mole-rat
Fukomys ilariae - Somali striped mole-rat
Fukomys kafuensis - Kafue mole-rat
Fukomys mechowii - Mechow's mole-rat
Fukomys micklemi - Kataba mole-rat
Fukomys ochraceocinereus - Ochre mole-rat
Fukomys whytei - Malawian mole-rat 
subspecies: F. w. occlusus 
Fukomys zechi - Ghana mole-rat
Heliophobius - Silvery mole-rat
Heliophobius argenteocinereus - Silvery mole-rat
Bathyergus - Dune blesmols
Bathyergus janetta - Namaqua dune mole-rat
Bathyergus suillus - Cape dune mole-rat

Citations

References
Kingdon, J. 1997. The Kingdon Field Guide to African Mammals. Academic Press Limited, London.
McKenna, M.C. and S. K. Bell. 1997. Classification of Mammals above the Species Level. Columbia University Press, New York.
Nowak, R. M. 1999. Walker's Mammals of the World, Vol. 2. Johns Hopkins University Press, London.
Seney ML, Kelly DA, Goldman BD, Šumbera R, Forger NG (2009) Social Structure Predicts Genital Morphology in African Mole-Rats. PLoS ONE 4(10): e7477. doi: 10.1371/journal.pone.0007477. Figure
Mitgutsch, C., Richardson, M. K., Jiménez, R., Martin, J. E., Kondrashov, P., de, B. M. A., & Sánchez-Villagra, M. R. (January 1, 2012). Circumventing the polydactyly 'constraint': the mole's 'thumb'. Biology Letters, 8, 1, 74–7.

External links

 
Hystricognath rodents
Rodents by common name
Extant Miocene first appearances